Gilbert Duchateau (born 4 January 1948) is a Belgian sports shooter. He competed in the mixed trap event at the 1984 Summer Olympics.

References

External links
 

1948 births
Living people
Belgian male sport shooters
Olympic shooters of Belgium
Shooters at the 1984 Summer Olympics
People from Sint-Truiden
Sportspeople from Limburg (Belgium)